Nathalie Amiel (born November 4, 1970) is a former French rugby union player. She represented  at three World Cup's in 1991, 1994 and the 2002 Women's Rugby World Cup. She debuted for  against Great Britain in 1986 at the age of 15.

Amiel practised judo when she was young. Her mother registered her for a club which offered women's rugby when she was 12. Her initial position was at Flanker, she later switched to centre near the end of her playing career in 2002.

Amiel was inducted into the IRB Hall of Fame on 17 November 2014.

References

1970 births
Living people
Sportspeople from Béziers
French female rugby union players
World Rugby Hall of Fame inductees